Ronnie Edward Prude Jr. (born June 4, 1982) is a former American football cornerback. He played college football at LSU and was signed by the Baltimore Ravens as an undrafted free agent in 2006.

Prude has also been a member of the Atlanta Falcons, Sacramento Mountain Lions and Edmonton Eskimos.

College career
Prude played college football at Louisiana State. During his career he played in 52 games making 114 tackles and three interceptions. He earned a degree in communications.

Professional career

Baltimore Ravens
Prude was signed by the Baltimore Ravens as a rookie free agent on May 12, 2006. In his rookie season he played in 15 games and made nine tackles he also recorded two interceptions in 2006, returning one interception against the Saints back for a touchdown. The following year, he made 13 tackles.

An exclusive-rights free agent in the 2008 offseason, Prude signed his one-year tender offer on April 23. He was waived during final cuts on August 30.

Atlanta Falcons
After spending the 2008 season out of football, Prude was signed by the Atlanta Falcons on January 7, 2009. He was waived on May 15.

California Redwoods
Prude was signed by the California Redwoods of the United Football League on August 18, 2009.

Edmonton Eskimos
On March 30, 2012, Prude signed with the Edmonton Eskimos of the Canadian Football League. On August 10, 2012, Prude suffered a neck injury and had to be taken off the field by stretcher after lying motionless for a few minutes after trying to tackle former Saskatchewan Roughrider Terence Jeffers-Harris. He was released by the Eskimos on April 18, 2013.

Personal life
Prude is a cousin of former Minnesota Vikings wide receiver Anthony Carter and current New York Jets cornerback Morris Claiborne.

References

External links
Just Sports Stats
Edmonton Eskimos player bio
LSU Tigers bio

1982 births
Living people
American football cornerbacks
Atlanta Falcons players
Baltimore Ravens players
Sacramento Mountain Lions players
Edmonton Elks players
LSU Tigers football players
Players of American football from Shreveport, Louisiana